Ovenna vicaria, the ubiquitous footman, is a moth of the subfamily Arctiinae. It was described by Francis Walker in 1854. It is found in Africa, where it has been recorded from Angola, Cameroon, the Republic of the Congo, the Democratic Republic of the Congo, Guinea, Lesotho, Malawi, Mozambique, Nigeria, South Africa, Uganda and Zambia. Records from the Oriental region refer to Brunia antica.

References

Lithosiini
Moths described in 1854
Insects of the Democratic Republic of the Congo
Insects of Uganda
Insects of Angola
Fauna of the Republic of the Congo
Insects of West Africa
Moths of Africa